Saint Fidelis may refer to:

Fidelis of Como (San Fedele)  (died ca. 304 AD), Italian soldier-saint
Fidelis of Sigmaringen (1577-1622), Capuchin friar martyred in the Counter-Reformation
Basilica of St. Fidelis, the Cathedral of the Plains